John Finbar Cassin (23 November 1924 – 14 January 2017), known professionally as Barry Cassin, was an Irish television, stage and screen actor. On stage, he is best known for his role in the production of Twelve Angry Men.

On screen, Cassin played mostly secondary roles such as in the television series Mystic Knights of Tir Na Nog, in 2004 he was Fr. Griffin in The Blackwater Lightship for the Hallmark Hall of Fame and the 2012 film Byzantium. He introduced the works of John B. Keane and notably directed the first stage production of The Field. Cassin's daughter, Anne, is a well-known journalist and news presenter for Raidió Teilifís Éireann.

Filmography

References

External links

1924 births
2017 deaths
20th-century Irish male actors
Irish theatre directors
Irish male television actors
Irish male film actors
21st-century Irish male actors
Irish male stage actors
Place of birth missing
Place of death missing